Didouche may refer to:

 Mourad Didouche (1927–1955), a veteran of the Algerian War of independence (1954–1962).
 Didouche Mourad, a town and commune in Constantine Province within Algeria.

Arabic-language surnames